Le-Neal Jackson (birth 30 September 1994) is a South African field hockey player.

International career
Jackson made her debut for the test, RSA v USA in Durban. Shortly after this announcement, he was also named in the squad for the 2022 African Cup of Nations and the Commonwealth Games in Birmingham.

Personal life
Jackson attended Queen's College Boys' High School,  and University of Johannesburg.

References

External links

1994 births
Living people
Field hockey players from Cape Town
South African male field hockey players
Field hockey players at the 2022 Commonwealth Games
University of Johannesburg alumni
People from Queenstown, South Africa

Alumni of Queen's College Boys' High School